SS Sankt Erik is an icebreaker and museum ship attached to the Vasa Museum in Stockholm, Sweden.

She was launched in 1915 as Isbrytaren II ("Ice breaker II") and was a conventionally-built Baltic icebreaker with a strengthened bow shaped to be lifted up onto the ice to crush it and a forward-facing screw to push water and crushed ice along the side of the hull. She also has heeling tanks which can be filled and emptied with seawater in turn to rock the ship to widen the channel. Her reciprocating steam engines are the most powerful functioning ones in Sweden.

She was the country's first large icebreaker, and was owned and used by the City of Stockholm to keep the channels around it clear of ice. She was also sometimes used outside the Stockholm area by the Swedish government since it had contributed towards her cost.

She was renamed in 1958 during an extensive refit, which saw her converted from coal to oil, the bridge was enclosed to protect the deck crew from the weather, and radar and radio fitted.

References
 Vasa museum
 Paper on the restoration of the ship presented at the Third International Conference on the Technical Aspects of the Preservation of Historic Vessels in 1997
 Miramar Ship Index - Isbrytaren II

Museum ships in Sweden
Icebreakers of Sweden
1915 ships
Steamships of Sweden
Ships built in Stockholm